FEBA may refer to:

 Forward Edge of Battle Area, i.e. front line
Feba Radio, a broadcasting network.
FEBA Fingerprinting, a LiveScan fingerprint and passport photo provider.